Laki or Lakagígar (Craters of Laki) is a volcanic fissure in the western part of Vatnajökull National Park, Iceland, not far from the volcanic fissure of Eldgjá and the small village of Kirkjubæjarklaustur. The fissure is properly referred to as Lakagígar, while Laki is a mountain that the fissure bisects. Lakagígar is part of a volcanic system centered on the volcano Grímsvötn and including the volcano Þórðarhyrna. It lies between the glaciers of Mýrdalsjökull and Vatnajökull, in an area of fissures that run in a southwest to northeast direction.

This led to a famine which then killed approximately a quarter of the island's human population.

The Laki eruption and its aftermath caused a drop in global temperatures, as 120 million tonnes of sulfur dioxide was spewed into the Northern Hemisphere. This caused crop failures in Europe and may have caused droughts in North Africa and India.

1783 eruption

On 8 June 1783, a  fissure of at least 130 vents opened with phreatomagmatic explosions because of the groundwater interacting with the rising basalt magma. Over a few days the eruptions became less explosive, Strombolian, and later Hawaiian in character, with high rates of lava effusion. This event is rated as 4 on the Volcanic Explosivity Index, but the eight-month emission of sulfuric aerosols resulted in one of the most important climatic and socially significant natural events of the last millennium.

The eruption continued until 7 February 1784, but most of the lava was ejected in the first five months. One study states that the event "occurred as ten pulses of activity, each starting with a short-lived explosive phase followed by a long-lived period of fire-fountaining". Grímsvötn volcano, from which the Laki fissure extends, also erupted at the time, from 1783 until 1785. The outpouring of gases, including an estimated 8 million tonnes of fluorine and an estimated 120 million tonnes of sulfur dioxide, gave rise to what has since become known as the "Laki haze" across Europe.

Consequences in Iceland
An estimated 20–25% of the population died in the famine after the fissure eruptions ensued. (Some sources specify a death toll of 9,000 people.) Approximately 80% of sheep, 50% of cattle and 50% of horses died because of dental fluorosis and skeletal fluorosis from the 8 million tons of fluorine that were released. The livestock deaths were primarily caused by eating the contaminated grass; the subsequent famine claimed many of the human lives that were lost.

The church farm of Kirkjubæjarklaustur was endangered by a branch of the lava flow that halted not far from the farm while the Rev. Jón and his parishioners were worshipping in the church.

Consequences in monsoon regions
There is evidence that the Laki eruption weakened African and Indian monsoon circulations, leading to between  less daily precipitation than normal over the Sahel of Africa, resulting in, among other effects, low flow in the River Nile. The resulting famine that afflicted Egypt in 1784 cost it roughly one-sixth of its population. The eruption was also found to have affected South Arabia and India.

Consequences in East Asia
The Great Tenmei famine of 1782–1788 in Japan may have been worsened by the Laki eruption. In the same year, Mt. Asama erupted in Japan (Tenmei eruption).

Consequences in Europe

An estimated 120,000,000 tonnes of sulfur dioxide was emitted, about three times the total annual European industrial output in 2006 (but delivered to higher altitudes, hence its persistence), and equivalent to six times the total 1991 Mount Pinatubo eruption. This outpouring of sulfur dioxide during unusual weather conditions caused a thick haze to spread across western Europe, resulting in many thousands of deaths throughout the remainder of 1783 and the winter of 1784.

The summer of 1783 was the hottest on record and a rare high-pressure zone over Iceland caused the winds to blow to the south-east. The poisonous cloud drifted to Bergen in Denmark–Norway, then spread to Prague in the Kingdom of Bohemia (now the Czech Republic) by 17 June, Berlin by 18 June, Paris by 20 June, Le Havre by 22 June, and Great Britain by 23 June. The fog was so thick that ships stayed in port, unable to navigate, and the sun was described as "blood coloured". 

Inhaling sulfur dioxide gas causes victims to choke as their internal soft tissues swell – the gas reacts with the moisture in the lungs and produces sulfurous acid. The local death rate in Chartres was up by 5% during August and September, with more than 40 dead. In Great Britain, the east of England was most affected. The records show that the additional deaths were among outdoor workers; the death rate in Bedfordshire, Lincolnshire, and the east coast was perhaps two or three times the normal rate. It has been estimated that 23,000 British people died from the poisoning.

The weather became very hot, causing severe thunderstorms with large hailstones that were reported to have killed cattle, until the haze dissipated in the autumn. The winter of 1783–1784 was very severe; the naturalist Gilbert White in Selborne, Hampshire, reported 28 days of continuous frost. The extreme winter is estimated to have caused 8,000 additional deaths in the UK. During the spring thaw, Germany and Central Europe reported severe flood damage. This is considered part of a volcanic winter.

The meteorological impact of Laki continued, contributing significantly to several years of extreme weather in Europe. In France, the sequence of extreme weather events included a failed harvest in 1785 that caused poverty for rural workers, as well as droughts, bad winters and summers. These events contributed significantly to an increase in poverty and famine that may have contributed to the French Revolution in 1789. Laki was only one factor in a decade of climatic disruption, as Grímsvötn was erupting from 1783 to 1785, and there may have been an unusually strong El Niño effect from 1789 to 1793.

Consequences in North America
In North America, the winter of 1784 was the longest and one of the coldest on record. It was the longest period of below-zero temperatures in New England, with the largest accumulation of snow in New Jersey, and the longest freezing over of Chesapeake Bay. At the time, the capital of the United States was situated on the Chesapeake at Annapolis, Maryland; the weather delayed Congressmen who were traveling there to vote for the Treaty of Paris, which formally ended the American Revolutionary War.  A huge snowstorm hit the South; the Mississippi River froze at New Orleans and there were reports of ice floes in the Gulf of Mexico.

Contemporaneous reports

Gilbert White recorded his perceptions of the event at Selborne, Hampshire, England:

Benjamin Franklin recorded his observations in America in a 1784 lecture:

According to contemporary records, Hekla did not erupt in 1783; its previous eruption was in 1766.

Sir John Cullum of Bury St Edmunds, Suffolk, England, recorded his observations on 23 June 1783 (the same date on which Gilbert White noted the onset of the unusual atmospheric phenomena), in a letter to Sir Joseph Banks, then President of the Royal Society:

Sir John goes on to describe the effect of this "frost" on trees and crops:

See also

 Geography of Iceland
 Glacial lake outburst flood
 Iceland hotspot
 List of glaciers of Iceland
 List of volcanic eruptions by death toll  
 List of volcanoes in Iceland
 List of waterfalls of Iceland
 Plate tectonics
 Timeline of volcanism on Earth
 Volcanism of Iceland
 List of volcanic eruptions in Iceland

References

Further reading
 Brayshay, M and Grattan, J. "Environmental and social responses in Europe to the 1783 eruption of the Laki fissure volcano in Iceland: a consideration of contemporary documentary evidence" in Firth, C. R. and McGuire, W. J. (eds) Volcanoes in the Quaternary. Geological Society, London, Special Publication 161, 173–187, 1999
 
 
 Grattan, D., Schütenhelm, R. and Brayshay, M. "Volcanic gases, environmental crises and social response" in Grattan, J. and Torrence, R. (eds) Natural Disasters and Cultural Change, Routledge, London 87–106. 2002.
 
 Jón Steingrímsson. A Very Present Help in Trouble: The Autobiography of the Fire-priest. Translated by Michael Fell. New York: Lang, 2002.
 
 "The Summer of Acid Rain", Economist, December 19, 2007.
 
 Witze, Alexandra and Jeff Kanipe. Island on Fire: The Extraordinary Story of Laki, the Volcano That Turned Eighteenth-Century Europe Dark. Profile Books, 2014. .

External links

 Photos and information
 Information about the volcanism at Laki
 Lakagígar
 A meditation on Jón Steingrímsson from Anglicans Online
 Dr John Grattan at International Volcanic Heath Hazard Network
 A Sulphurous Stench: Illness and Death in Europe Following the Eruption of the Laki Fissure
 The Dry Fog of 1783: Environmental Impact and Human Reaction to the Lakagígar Eruption
 Official Website of Vatnajökull National Park

1783 in Europe
1783 natural disasters
18th century in Iceland
18th-century volcanic events
Active volcanoes
East Volcanic Zone of Iceland
Events that forced the climate
Fissure vents
Grímsvötn
Mountains of Iceland
Natural disasters in Iceland
VEI-4 volcanoes
Volcanic eruptions in Iceland
Volcanic winters
Volcanoes of Iceland